Manuela Ernst (born 1985) is a Swiss politician (glp). She is a member of the Grand Council of the Canton of Aargau.

Politics 
Since January 5, 2021 Ernst is a member of the legislative of the canton of Aargau, the Grand Council. She is also a member of the parliament of her home town Wettingen.

References 

Aargau politicians
1985 births
Living people